Bernardin Gigault, Marquis de Bellefonds (1630–1694) was a French nobleman, soldier and courtier of the 17th century, who was appointed Marshal of France in 1668 and held a number of senior positions in the personal household of Louis XIV.

Life

While the family came from Bellefonds, in the central French department of Nouvelle-Aquitaine, Bernadin's branch settled in Chef-du-Pont, near Valognes, in Normandy. His paternal grandfather Bernardin Gigault de Bellefonds (1580–1639) was Governor of Valognes and Caen; his grandmother Jeanne Suzanne (?–1652) was the daughter of Henri-Robert-aux-Épaules, Lieutenant général du roi in Normandy.

Bernadin was the only child of Henri-Robert Gigault (?–1643), also Governor of Valognes and Caen, and Marie d'Avoynes, who brought the Servigny properties into the family. His father was one of eight and he had a wide circle of relatives in Normandy and Acquitaine.

He married Madeleine Fouquet de Chalain (1639–1716) in 1655 and they had 9 children; Jean (1660–1668), Louis-Christophe, killed at Steenkerque in 1692, Marie-Éléonore (?–1717), Thérèse-Marie (1667–1733), Jeanne-Susanne (1665–1698), Louise (?), Bernardine-Thérèse (?–1717), Françoise Bonne (1676–1693) and Marie-Armande-Agnès. His titles and estates were inherited by his grandson, Louis-Charles Bernadin (1685–1710).

Career

In the first half of the 17th century, France was divided internally and threatened externally; while it largely stayed out of the 1618–1648 Thirty Years' War, support for the Dutch Republic in its war of independence from Spain eventually led to the 1635–1659 Franco-Spanish War. At home, the French Wars of Religion that had ended with the 1590 Edict of Nantes flared up again in a series of domestic Huguenot rebellions in the 1620s.

The accession of the five-year old Louis XIV in 1643 caused a power struggle between his regents, headed by his mother, Anne of Austria and Cardinal Mazarin, opposed by regional magnates like Condé. This resulted in the 1648–1653 civil war known as the Fronde; Bellefonds became Governor of Valognes after his father's death in 1643 and in 1649 held it against rebel troops or Frondeurs. Similarly, in November 1651 he defended Cognac in Nouvelle-Aquitaine when besieged by Frondeurs under Condé, until it was relieved by the Comte d'Harcourt in early December.

In the latter stages of the Franco-Spanish war, he served in Catalonia and Flanders, including the decisive Battle of the Dunes in June 1658, which led to the 1659 Treaty of the Pyrenees and he was promoted Lieutenant-General in 1659. He was also employed in maritime operations, acting as deputy to the duc de Guise in his failed attempt to capture Naples in 1654 and in 1666 was sent to the Dutch Republic to discuss joint fleet operations against England.

In 1663, he was appointed head of the Maison du Roi or the King's household; given its proximity to Louis XIV, this was a position of great importance, held by an individual of proven loyalty. In the 1667–1668 War of Devolution, France quickly over-ran Franche-Comté and much of the Spanish Netherlands; after the capture of Lille in 1667, Turenne detached a cavalry force under Bellefonds and de Créquy to cut off the Spanish retreat. They inflicted nearly 2,000 casualties, with Louis looking on; in 1668, Bellefonds, de Créquy and Humières were all created Marshals of France.

However, the Dutch preferred a weak Spain as a neighbour in the Spanish Netherlands, to a strong and ambitious France; with England and Sweden, they formed the Triple Alliance obliging Louis to return most of his gains in the 1668 Treaty of Aix-la-Chapelle. Angered by what he viewed as ingratitude for previous French support against Spain, Louis made preparations to invade the Netherlands.

In April 1672, Turenne was appointed general en chef or senior commander of French forces in the Netherlands; this caused problems, as the convention was Marshalls did not serve under other Marshalls. Bellefonds, Humières and de Créquy refused to serve under Turenne, arguing that to do so would diminish their personal prestige and the position of Marshal; all three were banished to their estates, while Bellefonds also lost his position as head of the Maison du Roi.

When the Franco-Dutch War began in May 1672, the French over-ran much of the Dutch Republic and initially seemed to have achieved an overwhelming victory. By late July, the Dutch position had stabilised and they gained the support of Brandenburg-Prussia, Emperor Leopold and Charles II of Spain. With new fronts opening in Spain and the Rhineland, Louis decided to withdraw from the Dutch Republic by the end of 1673. 

Bellefonds and his two colleagues had been taken back into service in November 1672 and he was put in charge of operations in the Netherlands. All Dutch towns held by the French were evacuated except for Grave and Maastricht, providing him with an army of 15,000 troops. Ignoring orders to remain on the defensive, in May 1674 he attacked and captured Fort Navagne and Argenteau, Spanish-held positions on the Meuse between Maastricht and Liège. A large Allied army was based nearby, which left his force dangerously exposed; Conde managed to reinforce him first but Bellefonds was removed from command.

While he never recovered his previous office in the Maison du Roi, in 1680 he was appointed head of household or Grand Ecuyer to La Dauphine, Maria Anna of Bavaria, a position he held until her death in April 1690. In the 1683–1684 War of the Reunions, he once again commanded the French army in Catalonia and besieged the town of Girona, although he was forced to retreat in May 1684, shortly before the Truce of Ratisbon.

Bellefonds had been acquainted with James II of England since the 1650s and following his exile to France in the 1688 Glorious Revolution, accompanied him on religious retreats to La Trappe Abbey. In 1690, he was nominated general of French forces fighting in the Williamite War in Ireland to restore James to his throne but the Marquis de St Ruth was selected instead and was killed at Aughrim in July 1691. In 1692, he was given command of the expeditionary corps assembled at Saint-Vaast-la-Hougue to support a proposed invasion of England. This ended after an inconclusive naval battle between the French and a combined Anglo-Dutch fleet at Barfleur on 29 May; a few days later, 12 French ships that had taken refuge at La Hogue were destroyed, while French land forces failed to intervene. Clearly fearing he would be blamed, Bellefonds wrote a lengthy explanation to the naval minister, the Comte de Pontchartrain.

Regardless of who was to blame, this was his final military command; he died on 4 December 1694 at the Château de Vincennes and buried in Sainte-Chapelle de Vincennes, next to his daughter Françoise Bonne who died in 1693. His eldest son Louis-Christophe was killed at Steenkerque in 1692 and his titles and estates were inherited by his grandson, Louis-Charles Bernadin (1685–1710).

Legacy

Bellefonds was considered by contemporaries to be a man of morality but inflexible once he had decided on a course of action, which led to his banishment in 1672 and removal from command in 1674. He was known for religious piety, financing Notre-Dame-des-Anges, a convent near Rouen established in 1650 by his aunt, Laurence Gigault de Bellefonds (1610–1683). He was also associated with the abbey of Port-Royal-des-Champs, a centre of Jansenist thought, a then popular doctrine within French Catholicism controversial for its similarities to Calvinism. Finally, he was close to Jacques-Bénigne Bossuet, Bishop to the Court at Versailles, and like him supported the decision of Louis' mistress Louise de La Vallière to enter a Carmelite convent in Paris in 1675.

His letters to and from Louis XIV concerning the education of the Dauphin were later collected and published in Lettres sur l'éducation du dauphin; suivies de Lettres au maréchal de Belle-fonds et au roi. Introd. et notes de E. Levesque.

The Rue de Bellefond in Paris is named after his daughter Marie-Éléonore, Abbess of nearby Montmartre Abbey, demolished in 1794.

References

Sources
 
 
 ;
 ;
 
 ;
 
 ;
 
 ;
 ; 
 ;

1630 births
1694 deaths
People from Manche
Marshals of France
Ancien Régime
Order of the Holy Spirit
French military personnel of the Franco-Dutch War
French military personnel of the Nine Years' War